Doc Watson at Gerde's Folk City is the title of live recordings by American folk music and country blues artist Doc Watson, released in 2001. The recordings are of Watson's first solo public performances, recorded in 1962 and 1963 at Gerde's Folk City. The tracks were never released prior to 2001.

Reception

Writing for Allmusic, music critic Rick Anderson wrote of the album "... what is consistently striking is his mastery of the stage and the warmth and gentle virtuosity of his playing — attributes that would later come to define his art, but which are remarkable in an artist performing solo for the first time... Highly recommended."

Track listing
 "Little Sadie" (Traditional) – 2:23
 "Blue Smoke" (Merle Travis) – 2:12
 "St. Louis Blues" (W. C. Handy) – 2:36
 "John Herald Introduction" – 0:39
 "Sing Song Kitty" –  2:51
 "The House Carpenter" (Traditional) – 4:30
 "Liberty" (Traditional) – 1:46
 "The Old Wooden Rocker" (Bradley Kincaid) – 3:06
 "Milk Cow Blues" (Kokomo Arnold) – 2:10
 "Tragic Romance" (Grandpa Jones aka Louis Marshall Jones) – 3:59
 "The Dream of the Miner's Child" (Andrew Jenkins) – 3:07
 "The Wagoner's Lad" – 3:20
 "Cannonball Rag" (Merle Travis) – 1:54
 "The Lone Pilgrim" – 4:27
 "The Roving Gambler" – 2:28

Personnel
Doc Watson – guitar, banjo, mandolin, harmonica, vocals
Bob Yellen – banjo
John Herald – guitar, vocals
The Greenbriar Boys
Production notes:
Producer, liner notes, mastering by Peter K. Siegel
Photography by John Cohen and David Gahr, George Pickow
Mastering by David Glasser

References

2001 compilation albums
Doc Watson compilation albums
Sugar Hill Records compilation albums